Dominik Schmid (born 6 January 1989) is a German footballer who plays as a forward for TV Riedenburg.

References

External links
 
 Dominik Schmid on FuPa.net

1989 births
Living people
People from Kelheim
Sportspeople from Lower Bavaria
German footballers
Association football forwards
SSV Jahn Regensburg players
3. Liga players
Footballers from Bavaria
SSV Jahn Regensburg II players